Flóahreppur is a municipality located in southern Iceland.

Notable landmarks 
Dælarétt
Flóaáveitan
Hraungerðiskirkja
Hvítá
Laugdælakirkja, Bobby Fischer a former chess grandmaster is buried there.
Urriðafoss
Villingaholtskirkja
Þjórsá
Ölvisholt brugghús

References

External links 
Official website 

Municipalities of Iceland